The Fukang meteorite is a meteorite that was found in the mountains near Fukang, China in 2000. It is a pallasite—a type of stony–iron meteorite with olivine crystals. It is estimated to be 4.5 billion years old.

History

Subsequently, the mass was investigated at the Southwest Meteorite Center, Lunar and Planetary Laboratory, University of Arizona in Tucson, Arizona by Dr. Lauretta and a team of research scientists including Dolores Hill, Marvin Killgore, Daniella DellaGiustina, and Dr. Yulia Goreva, and joined by Dr. Ian Franchi of Open University.

Classification and composition
The Fukang pallasite contains large, gem quality olivine, or peridot, in a nickel-iron matrix.
The olivines vary in shape from rounded to angular, many are fractured and they range in size from less than five millimetres to several centimetres.
The main mass contains several regions of massive olivine clusters up to eleven centimetres (4.3 inches) in diameter with thin metal veins. Fo86.4 with molar Fe/Mg = 0.1367, Fe/Mn = 40.37, and Ni = 0.03 wt%. The metal matrix is mostly kamacite with an average nickel content of 6.98 wt%. Vermicular sulfide (troilite) is present in some olivine.
 Oxygen isotopes: δ18O 2.569 ‰, δ17O 1.179 ‰, ∆1 7O = −0.157 ‰.

Specimens
A section weighing  of type specimen is on deposit at the University of Arizona. Marvin Killgore holds an additional section weighing the same amount, as well as the balance of the main mass.

In April 2008, Bonhams offered the main mass for auction at their Manhattan auction. Bonhams expected to fetch US$2,000,000, but the lot remained unsold.

See also
 Glossary of meteoritics

References

External links
 
 Southwest Meteorite Laboratory - Fukang Pallasite

Meteorites found in China
Stony-iron meteorites
Changji Hui Autonomous Prefecture
2000 in science
2000 in China